Laimjala Parish (also called the Laimjala rural municipality or Laimjala parish) was in Saare County, Estonia.

This parish did consist of 24 villages. The municipality had a population of 793 people (as of 1 January 2006) and covers an area of 116 km².

During the administrative-territorial reform in 2017, all 12 municipalities on the island Saaremaa were merged into a single municipality – Saaremaa Parish.

Villages
Aaviku - Asva - Audla - Jõe - Kahtla - Käo - Kapra - Kingli - Kõiguste - Laheküla - Laimjala - Mägi-Kurdla - Mustla - Nõmme - Pahavalla - Paju-Kurdla - Randvere - Rannaküla - Ridala - Ruhve - Saareküla - Saaremetsa - Üüvere - Viltina

See also 
Municipalities of Estonia
List of municipalities of Estonia

References

External links
Official home page (only in the Estonian language)